Petrogypsies is a science fiction novel by Rory Harper. It incorporates a short story that was published in 1985 in Far Frontiers, vol 2. The novel's plot focuses on a group of oil field workers in an alternate Texas who use giant, semi-sentient, worm-like creatures—possibly of extraterrestrial origin—to drill their wells, and on Sprocket, the team's drilling beast.

DarkStar Books and Rory Harper plan to continue the series in two new books, Sprocket Goes International and Sprocket Goes interstellar.

Publication history
Originally released in mass market paperback by Baen Books in 1989, Petrogypsies was re-released in December 2009 by DarkStar Books in a revised, semi-illustrated trade paperback version with new cover art by Hugo Award winning artist Brad Foster and illustrations by Jason Carranza.

"Petrogypsies". In Far Frontiers, vol.2. Eds.: Jerry Pournelle and Jim Baen. New York:  Baen Books, 1985
Petrogypsies.  New York:  Baen Books, 1989. 
Petrogypsies.  College Station, Texas:  DarkStar Books, 2009.

Reviews

"Petrogypsies is a worthy addition to that body of literature that Texas can proudly claim as her own." A Newsvine review of Petrogypsies by Falkeep

References

1989 American novels
1989 science fiction novels
American science fiction novels
Novels set in Texas
Novels set in Oklahoma